Engineering studies is an interdisciplinary branch of social sciences and humanities devoted to the study of engineers and their activities, often considered a part of science and technology studies (STS), and intersecting with and drawing from engineering education research. Studying engineers refers among other to the history and the sociology of their profession, its institutionalization and organization, the social composition and structure of the population of engineers, their training, their trajectory, etc. A subfield is for instance Women in engineering. Studying engineering refers to the study of engineering activities and practices, their knowledge and ontologies, their role into the society, their engagement.

Engineering studies investigates how social, political, economical, cultural and historical dynamics affect technological research, design, engineering and innovation, and how these, in turn, affect society, economics, politics and culture.

Engineering studies's mission is to further develop many different aspects of studies of engineers and engineering, it investigates in areas such as: history, culture, polity etc. These studies will have influence on world's engineering level and productivity. Which it provides information and scholar resources for researchers who's interested in studies of engineers and engineering. Also, engineering studies provides a platform for engineering studies research to be reviewed and discussed.

Subfields and related fields 

History of engineering
Sociology of engineers
Women in engineering
Engineering ethnography
Engineering culture and representation
Design studies
Social study of engineering sciences
Engineering in society and political study of engineering
Organizational studies of engineers and engineering
Critical approach and philosophy of engineering
Engineering education
Engineering ethics
Science and Technology Studies
Social construction of technology (SCOT)
Social shaping of technology
Technological change
Sociology of innovation
History of technology
(Constructive) Technology Assessment

Concepts

Journals 
Engineering Studies
International Journal of Engineering, Social Justice, and Peace (IJESJP)

Associations 
The International Network for Engineering Studies (INES)
Society for the History of the Technology
Society for Philosophy and Technology
Society for the Social Study of Science (4S)
European Society for the Study of Science and Technology
Société d'Anthropologie des Connaissances
Engineering, Social Justice, and Peace network

See also
 Engineering education
 Engineering research

References

Citations

Sources 

 Bijker, Wiebe, Thomas Hughes & Trevor Pinch (eds.) (1987). The Social Construction of Technological Systems: New Directions in the Sociology and History of Technology Cambridge MA/London: MIT Press.
 Bijker, Wiebe & John Law (eds.) (1994). Shaping Technology / Building Society: Studies in Sociotechnical Change. Cambridge, Massachusetts: MIT Press (Inside Technology Series).
 Downey, Gary Lee (1998) The Machine in Me: An Anthropologist Sits Among Computer Engineers. Routledge.
 Downey, Gary Lee & Kacey Beddoes (eds) (2011) What is Global Engineering Education For? The Making of International Educators. Morgan and Claypool Publishers.
Hughes, Thomas (1983) Networks of Power: Electrification in Western Society, 1880-1930, Baltimore: Johns Hopkins University Press.
Jasanoff, Sheila, Gerald Markle, James Petersen & Trevor Pinch (eds.) (1994). Handbook of Science and Technology Studies. Thousand Oaks, CA: Sage.
Latour, Bruno (1987). Science in action: How to follow scientists and engineers through society. Cambridge, Massachusetts: Harvard University Press.
MacKenzie, Donald & Judy Wajcman (eds.) (1999). The Social Shaping of Technology: How the Refrigerator Got Its Hum, Milton Keynes, Open University Press.
MacKenzie, Donald (1996). Knowing Machines: Essays on Technical Change. Cambridge, Massachusetts: MIT Press (Inside Technology Series).
Restivo, Sal (ed.) (2005), Science, Technology, and Society: An Encyclopedia. New York: Oxford.
Rip, Arie, Thomas J. Misa & Johan Schot (eds) (1995). Managing Technology in Society: The approach of Constructive Technology Assessment London/NY: Pinter.
Rosenberg, Nathan (1994) Exploring the Black Box: Technology, Economics and History, Cambridge: Cambridge University Press.
Vinck, Dominique (2003). Everyday engineering. Ethnography of design and innovation. Cambridge, Massachusetts: MIT Press.

External links

Engineering practices. The Knowledge of Action
Diversity in Engineering Bibliography
Engineering Studies

 
Interdisciplinary subfields of sociology
Engineering education